Raosaheb Dinanath Atmaram Dalvi (1844 – 10 February 1897) was an Indian judge and amateur mathematician. His father Atmaram Bapu Dalvi was a social reformer and was Vice President of the Bombay Arya Samaj in 1880.  He obtained his BA degree in 1865 from Elphinstone College in Bombay. He was then selected as Senior Scholar and later obtained MA degree from Elphinstone College in 1866. He then obtained his LLB degree in 1868 and was a Senior Dakshina Fellow in 1868. He was made Fellow of Bombay University in 1882–83.

In 1869 he wrote a book titled "An Examination of Sir Isaac Newton's Rule for finding the Number of Imaginary Square Roots in an Equation". He was Examiner for first Examination in Arts, Analytic Trigonometry, Arithmetic, and Algebra at Bombay University along with James Burgess who later on became Director General of Archaeological Survey of India and Assistant Governor of Bombay. He was appointed as a sub-judge in Bombay Presidency in 1873 and served in Junnar as a Second Class Subordinate Judge in 1876. He then became a sub-judge in 1883 at Akola in Ahmednagar district, in 1885 at Nevasa in Ahmednagar district, in 1888 at Satana, Erandol in Jalgaon District. In 1892, he was Subordinate Judge of Kada, Karjat in Ahmednagar District and in 1895, he was Subordinate Judge in Parner. 

Helena Blavatsky in her Book - "From the Caves and Jungles of Hindustan" has quoted him as possibly the greatest mathematical genius in the world. She has quoted that according to Sir James Braithwaite Peile, Director of National Education in India, Dalvi proved that the great Newton was mistaken from the beginning to the end in his "Rule for Imaginary Square roots" and the application of this Newtonian rule does not bring about the intended result. Sir James Braithwaite Peile also reported that D. A Dalvi blew the theorems of Professor James J Sylvester, one of the greatest English mathematicians, into smithereens. He wrote on Aryan Trigonometry and published in the Theosophist Part 1 1879-1880 how the Ancient Indian Trigonometrical rule for finding sine of an angle long antedates Hipparchus and Hindus before the beginning of the Christian Era, were in possession of the supposed recent trigonometrical discoveries of Euler. He married Shanta Dalvi and had 2 daughters namely Hira and Putala Dalvi and a son Madhusudan. D. Dalvi. His son M. D. Dalvi sailed for England in 1912 and returned to Bombay in 1920 after obtaining AMIES from the Institution of Engineers and Shipbuilders, Glasgow. He later became Chief Officer of Poona City Municipality  in 1940 following which he was appointed as Chief Engineer by the Last Nawab of Junagadh in the erstwhile Princely State of Junagadh at a time when Sir Shahnawaz Bhutto was the Dewan. His sister Hira Dalvi married Justice SS Patkar Pusine Judge, later Acting Chief Justice of the Bombay High Court.

References

1844 births
1897 deaths
Indian judges
Amateur mathematicians
Elphinstone College alumni